Al-Hussein, is an Iraqi football club based in Baghdad. They were crowned champions of the 2015–16 Iraq Division One which promoted them to the Iraqi Premier League for the first time in their history.

History
Al-Hussein, named after the Imam of Shia Husayn ibn Ali, were founded in 1999 during the reign of Saddam Hussein. Their first participation in the Iraq FA Cup was in the 2002–03 edition when they were in the third division of Iraqi football; they faced Al-Tharthar in Round 1 on September 2, 2002 and the game ended 0–0 with Al-Hussein being knocked out of the competition via penalty shootout. By the 2004–05 season, Al-Hussein were in the Iraq Division One (the second division of Iraqi football) and in that season, they finished top of their group in the first stage with 20 points from ten games to qualify for the final stage. In the final stage, Al-Hussein needed to finish top of their group to be promoted to the Iraqi Premier League but they only achieved seven points from six matches and failed to gain promotion.

By the time the 2011–12 Iraq Division One came around, Al-Hussein had still failed to gain promotion. In that season, Al-Hussein performed poorly, finishing tenth in their 12-team group, losing half of their 22 matches. The 2012–13 Iraq Division One was a similar story as they only won one of their ten games and only managed to achieve six points from ten games. In the 2013–14 season, Al-Hussein performed better by winning nine of their 15 matches but this was not enough to qualify them for the second stage of the competition.

After many seasons trying to get promoted to the top division of Iraq, Al-Hussein finally achieved it by being crowned champions of the 2015–16 Iraq Division One. They did so by finishing top of their group in the Elite Stage and then also finishing top of their group in the Golden Stage. That season, they also participated in the 2015–16 Iraq FA Cup and they were one of the best-performing teams in the tournament. In the preliminary round, they knocked out Al-Etisalat with a 2–1 win, and in the round of 32 they produced one of the biggest upsets of the cup, knocking out Al-Mina'a, one of the top teams in the Iraqi Premier League, with a 2–1 scoreline. They eased past fellow Division One team Balad 3–0 in the round of 16 to qualify for the quarter-finals, being one of only two lower division teams to reach the quarter-finals of that competition. In the quarter-final, Al-Hussein were drawn with Al-Zawra'a, who would eventually win the Iraqi Premier League that season without a single loss. However, Al-Hussein produced another shocking result, inflicting the first defeat of the season on Al-Zawra'a by beating them 2–1. But, unlike the previous rounds, the quarter-final consisted of two legs rather than just one, so Al-Zawra'a managed to recover the tie in the second leg and defeat Al-Hussein 3–1 to knock them out 4–3 on aggregate.

Current squad

First-team squad

Managerial history
  Maitham Dael-Haq
  Adel Acher 
  Sadiq Saadoun 
  Ziyad Qasim  (caretaker)
  Ali Wahab 
  Sabah Abdul Hassan 
  Karim Qumbil
  Kadhim Yousef 
  Habib Jafar 
  Sahel Naeem

Honours
Iraq Division One
Winner (1): 2015–16

References

External links
 Club's page on Goalzz.com

Football clubs in Iraq
Football clubs in Baghdad
Sport in Baghdad